Queen Charlotte Airlines was a Canadian airline founded by Jim Spilsbury that operated on the West Coast of Canada from 1946 to 1955, when it was sold to Pacific Western Airlines. Though the airline grew out of a bush flying operation, it became the third largest airline in Canada.

The book The Accidental Airline by Jim Spilsbury and Howard White tells the story of the QCA.

Fleet 

The following aircraft were operated by the QCA (this list is possibly incomplete):
Avro Anson
Beechcraft Model 17 Staggerwing
Bellanca Cruisair
Cessna 180 Skywagon
Cessna Crane
Consolidated PBY Catalina
De Havilland Canada DHC-2 Beaver
De Havilland Dragon Rapide
Douglas DC-3
Fairchild F-11 Husky
Grumman G-21 Goose
Noorduyn Norseman
Stinson 108
Supermarine Stranraer
Waco Standard YKC-S

See also 
 List of defunct airlines of Canada

References 

 Further reading
 

Defunct airlines of Canada
Airlines established in 1943
Airlines disestablished in 1955
Defunct seaplane operators